Józef Marcinkiewicz (30 March 1910 in Cimoszka, near Białystok, Poland – 1940 in Katyn, USSR) was a Polish mathematician.

He was a student of Antoni Zygmund; and later worked with Juliusz Schauder, Stefan Kaczmarz and Raphaël Salem. He was a professor of the Stefan Batory University in Wilno.

He enlisted in the Polish Army during the German invasion of Poland. In the aftermath of the simultaneous Soviet invasion of Poland, Marcinkiewicz was taken as a Polish POW to a Soviet camp in Starobielsk. The exact place and date of his death remain unknown, but it is believed that he died, when aged 30, in the Katyn massacre on the mass murder site near Smolensk. His parents, to whom he gave his manuscripts before the beginning of World War II, were transported to the Soviet Union in 1940 and later died of hunger in a camp.

Their fate is described by Zygmund described the last and his lost mathematical works as follows:

War broke out a few days after Marcinkiewicz returned to Wilno. Zygmund writes On 2 September, the second day of the war, I came across him accidentally in the street in Wilno, already in military uniform ... We agreed to meet the same day in the evening but apparently circumstances prevented him from coming since he did not show up at the appointed place. A few months later came the news that he was a prisoner of war and was asking for mathematical books. It seems that this was the last news about Marcinkiewicz. During his time in Paris and England, Marcinkiewicz had produced some mathematical work which he had written down in manuscript form. After returning to Poland he gave these manuscripts to his parents for safe keeping. Sadly Marcinkiewicz's parents suffered the same fate as he did and died during the war. No trace of the manuscripts was ever found.

See also
 Marcinkiewicz multiplier theorem
 Marcinkiewicz interpolation theorem
 Marcinkiewicz–Zygmund inequality

Notes

Bibliography
.
.

References
.

External links
 Biography of Józef Marcinkiewicz
 

1910 births
1940 deaths
People from Sokółka County
20th-century Polish mathematicians
World War II prisoners of war held by the Soviet Union
Katyn massacre victims
Polish military personnel killed in World War II
Academic staff of Vilnius University
Executed people from Podlaskie Voivodeship